George Sidney Simpson (September 21, 1908 – December 2, 1961) was an American sprinter. He competed at the 1932 Olympics and won a silver medal in the 200 m, placing fourth in the 100 m event. Simpson was the first to run 100 yards in 9.4 seconds, but because he used starting blocks, the record was never ratified. He was also fourth in the 100 meters at the 1932 Olympics. In 1929 he unofficially equaled the 200 meters World Record 20.6 seconds. Simpson attended Ohio State and won a national title in 1929.

Competition record

References

1908 births
1961 deaths
Ohio State University alumni
Ohio State Buckeyes men's track and field athletes
Athletes (track and field) at the 1932 Summer Olympics
American male sprinters
Medalists at the 1932 Summer Olympics
Olympic silver medalists for the United States in track and field